Alan Michael Buck (born 25 August 1946) is an English former footballer who played as a goalkeeper in the Football League for Colchester United.

Career

Born in Colchester, Buck joined hometown club Colchester United as an apprentice. He made his debut for Colchester in a 2–0 home defeat to Exeter City on 3 October 1964. He went on to make 38 league appearances for the club between 1964 and 1968, with his final appearance coming in a 4–0 defeat to Scunthorpe United at Layer Road on 26 August 1968. After leaving Colchester, he joined non-league side Poole Town.

Buck had a twin brother, David, who also played for Colchester United as a wing half, making one league appearance in 1965. David died in 1996.

References

1946 births
Living people
Sportspeople from Colchester
Twin sportspeople
English twins
English footballers
Association football goalkeepers
Colchester United F.C. players
Poole Town F.C. players
English Football League players